Prior to the amendment of Tamil Nadu Entertainments Tax Act 1939 on 1 April 1958, Gross was 133.33 per cent of Nett for all films. Commercial Taxes Department disclosed 0.79 crore in entertainment tax revenue for the year.

The following is a list of films produced in the Tamil film industry in India in 1954, in alphabetical order.

1954

References 

Films, Tamil
Lists of 1954 films by country or language
1954
1950s Tamil-language films